Exeter Book Riddle 44 (according to the numbering of the Anglo-Saxon Poetic Records) is one of the Old English riddles found in the later tenth-century Exeter Book. Its solution is accepted to be 'key'. However, the description evokes a penis; as such, Riddle 44 is noted as one of a small group of Old English riddles that engage in sexual double entendre, and thus provides rare evidence for Anglo-Saxon attitudes to sexuality.

Text and translation

As edited by Krapp and Dobbie, the riddle reads:

Editions

 Krapp, George Philip and Elliott Van Kirk Dobbie (eds), The Exeter Book, The Anglo-Saxon Poetic Records, 3 (New York: Columbia University Press, 1936), pp. 204-5, https://web.archive.org/web/20181206091232/http://ota.ox.ac.uk/desc/3009.
 Williamson, Craig (ed.), The Old English Riddles of the Exeter Book (Chapel Hill: University of North Carolina Press, 1977), no. 42.
 Muir, Bernard J. (ed.), The Exeter Anthology of Old English Poetry: An Edition of Exeter Dean and Chapter MS 3501, 2nd edn, 2 vols (Exeter: Exeter University Press, 2000).
 Foys, Martin et al. (eds.) Old English Poetry in Facsimile Project, (Madison, WI: Center for the History of Print and Digital Culture, 2019-). Online edition annotated and linked to digital facsimile, with a modern translation.

Recordings

 Michael D. C. Drout, 'Riddle 44', performed from the Anglo-Saxon Poetic Records edition (29 October 2007).

References

Riddles
Old English literature
Old English poetry